Bakehouse may refer to:

Bakery, an establishment that makes and/or sells flour-based products
Bakehouse (building), used for baking bread
Bakehouse (Dirmstein), a cultural heritage bakehouse in Dirmstein, Germany
 Bakehouse Theatre in Angas Street, Adelaide, South Australia